Debreceni HK is a Hungarian ice hockey team that currently plays in the OB I bajnokság. They play their home games at Debrecen Ice Hall, located in Debrecen.

Current roster
Current roster (as of March 2, 2017):

External links
 Official Club Website

Ice hockey teams in Hungary
Erste Liga (ice hockey) teams
Sports clubs in Debrecen
1989 establishments in Hungary
Ice hockey clubs established in 1989